Michel-Antoine Carré or Michel Carré (fils) (7 February 1865, Paris – 11 August 1945, Paris) was a French actor, stage and film director, and writer of opera librettos, stage plays and film scripts.

Career
He was the son of the librettist Michel Carré (père) (1821–1872) and cousin of the theatre director Albert Carré (his father's nephew).  His libretto for André Messager's 1894 opera Mirette was never performed in France but was performed in an English adaptation in London at the Savoy Theatre. 

He directed or co-directed some fifty silent films from c1907 to the mid 1920s. Many of these were shorts, including Ordre du roy (1909).  His longer notable films included L'Enfant prodigue, the first European-made full-length feature film (1907), based on his own stage pantomime of the same name; and The Miracle (1912), the world's first full-colour narrative feature film.

He was one of the main directors at the Société cinématographique des auteurs et gens de lettres (SCAGL), created to protect the rights of authors whose works were used in screenplays.

He was created chevalier of the French Legion of Honour in 1927

Works

Selected filmography
 L'Enfant prodigue (1907) (scriptwriter & director)
 Marie Tudor (1912) (scriptwriter)
 The Miracle'' (1912) (director)

References

External links
 Michel-Antoine Carré on imdb

1865 births
1945 deaths
Film directors from Paris